Oswald may refer to:

People
Oswald (given name), including a list of people with the name
Oswald (surname), including a list of people with the name

Fictional characters
Oswald the Reeve, who tells a tale in Geoffrey Chaucer's The Canterbury Tales
Oswald, servant of Goneril in Shakespeare's play King Lear
Oswald Bastable, in E. Nesbit's novel The Story of the Treasure Seekers and Michael Moorcock's unrelated novel The Warlord of the Air
Roald Dahl's title character in the novel My Uncle Oswald, as well as two short stories
Oswald the Lucky Rabbit, a cartoon character from the 1920s and 1930s created by Walt Disney
Oswald Chesterfield Cobblepot, Batman villain better known as the Penguin
Oswald Baskerville, in the Pandora Hearts manga
Oswald (comics), a Marvel Comics mutant
Clara Oswald, a character in the British science fiction TV series Doctor Who
Oswald Danes, in the British science fiction TV series Torchwood: Miracle Day
Oswald "Otto" Rocket, on the American animated children's TV series Rocket Power
Oswald, a blue octopus and main character in the Nick Jr. TV series Oswald
Oswald (King of Fighters), a video game character
Oswald, from the video game Odin Sphere
Oswald Mandus, the protagonist of the 2013 survival horror video game Amnesia: A Machine for Pigs

Places
Oswald, New South Wales, Australia, a suburb of the City of Maitland local government area
Oswald, Missouri, United States, a ghost town
Oswald, West Virginia, United States, an unincorporated community

Ships
, a World War II destroyer escort
, an Odin-class submarine built in 1928

Other uses
Oswald (TV series), an American-British children's animated television series, also the title character
OsWALD, a 1988 Danish computer game
Oswald Labs, an accessibility technology company
Oswald State Correctional Facility, a fictional prison in the television series Oz

See also
Baron St Oswald, a title in the Peerage of the United Kingdom
Saint Oswald (disambiguation)

Oswaldo, a given name
Oswalt, a given name and surname
Ostwald (disambiguation)